Tenis, or Tench, is the nearly extinct language of Tench Island in the St Matthias Islands of the Bismarck Archipelago.

References

Critically endangered languages
Endangered Austronesian languages
Endangered languages of Oceania
Languages of New Ireland Province
St Matthias languages